A pioneer cemetery is a cemetery for the earliest settlers in an area.

Pioneer Cemetery or variations such as Pioneer Memorial Cemetery may also refer to: 

in Australia
 Cleveland Pioneer Cemetery, Queensland
 Darwin Pioneer Cemetery, Northern Territory
 Gundaroo Catholic Pioneer Cemetery, New South Wales
 Kenwick Pioneer Cemetery, Western Australia
 Kingston Pioneer Cemetery, Queensland
 McLeod Street Pioneer Cemetery, Queensland
 Memorial Park Cemetery (Albany, Western Australia), or Pioneer Cemetery, Albany, Western Australia

 in Canada
 Nutana Pioneer Cemetery, Saskatoon, Saskatchewan

in the United States
 Bothell Pioneer Cemetery, Bothell, Washington
 Columbia Pioneer Cemetery, Portland, Oregon
 Dublin Pioneer Cemetery, Dublin, California
 Eugene Pioneer Cemetery, Eugene, Oregon
 Fernwood Pioneer Cemetery, Newberg, Oregon
 Grand Canyon Pioneer Cemetery, Arizona
 Gresham Pioneer Cemetery, Gresham, Oregon
 Hillsboro Pioneer Cemetery, Hillsboro, Oregon
 Houston Pioneer Cemetery, Eau Gallie, Florida
 Milwaukie Pioneer Cemetery, Milwaukie, Oregon
 Mormon Pioneer Cemetery, Florence (Omaha), Nebraska
 Mt. Angel Pioneer Cemetery, Mt. Angel, Oregon
 Palarm Bayou Pioneer Cemetery, Pulaski County, Arkansas
 Pioneer Cemetery (Evans, New York)
 Pioneer Cemetery (Sidney, New York)
 Pioneer Memorial Cemetery, Cincinnati, Ohio
 Pioneer Memorial Cemetery (San Bernardino, California)
 Pioneer Park Cemetery, Dallas, Texas
 Salem Pioneer Cemetery, Salem, Oregon
 San Fernando Pioneer Memorial Cemetery, Los Angeles, California
 Sierra Madre Pioneer Cemetery, Sierra Madre, California

See also
 List of pioneer cemeteries